Lamentations 5 is the fifth (and the last) chapter of the Book of Lamentations in the Hebrew Bible or the Old Testament of the Christian Bible, part of the Ketuvim ("Writings"). This chapter contains the elegies of the prophet Jeremiah as a humble prayer, presenting to the Lord their great misery (Lamentations 5:1-15), confessing their sins (Lamentations 5:16-18) and imploring deliverance (Lamentations 5:19-22).

Text
The original text was written in Hebrew language. This chapter is divided into 22 verses.

The fifth chapter (fifth elegy), though having 22 stanzas (the number of letters in the Hebrew alphabet) just as the first four, is not alphabetical and its lines are shorter than those of the others, which are longer than are found in other Hebrew poems. Each line contains twelve syllables, marked by a cæsura about the middle, dividing them into two somewhat unequal parts. This chapter serves as an epiphonema, or a closing recapitulation of the calamities treated in the previous chapters/elegies.

This last chapter of the book is called "the Prayer of Jeremiah" in some Greek copies, and in the Latin Vulgate, Syriac, and Arabic versions.

Textual versions
Some early witnesses for the text of this chapter in Hebrew are of the Masoretic Text, which includes Codex Leningradensis (1008). Fragments containing parts of this chapter were found among the Dead Sea Scrolls, i.e., 5Q6 (5QLama; 50 CE) with extant verses 1‑13, 16‑17.

There is also a translation into Koine Greek known as the Septuagint, made in the last few centuries BCE. Extant ancient manuscripts of the Septuagint version include Codex Vaticanus (B; B; 4th century), Codex Alexandrinus (A; A; 5th century) and Codex Marchalianus (Q; Q; 6th century).

Verse 1
 Remember, O , what is come upon us:
 consider, and behold our reproach.
 "Remember": The last chapter opens with a call to the Lord not to overlook the pleas in the previous lamentations.

Verse 8
Servants have ruled over us: 
there is none that doth deliver us out of their hand.
"Servants", or "slaves" in the Revised Standard Version and the Jerusalem Bible, refers to "Chaldean officials".

Verse 21

 Turn thou us unto thee, O Lord,
 and we shall be turned;
 renew our days as of old.
 "Renew our days as of old": a request for "restoration" (compare ; ;).

Verse 22
KJV:
 But thou hast utterly rejected us;
 thou art very wroth against us.

NKJV:
 Unless You have utterly rejected us,
 And are very angry with us!

Verse 22 in Hebrew
Masoretic text (from right to left)
 כי אם־מאס מאסתנו
 קצפת עלינו עד־מאד׃
Transliteration:
  - ,	
    .

In many manuscripts and for Synagogue use, Lamentations 5:21 is repeated after verse 22, so that the reading does not end with a painful statement, a practice which is also performed for the last verse of Isaiah, Ecclesiastes, and Malachi, "so that the reading in the Synagogue might close with words of comfort".

See also
 Jacob
 Judah
 Jerusalem
 Zion
Related Bible parts: Psalm 30, Isaiah 1, Jeremiah 3, Jeremiah 4

Notes

References

Sources

External links

Jewish
Lamentations 5 Hebrew with Parallel English
Lamentations 5 Hebrew with Rashi's Commentary

Christian
Lamentations 5 English Translation with Parallel Latin Vulgate 

05